Lee Shih-chuan (born 11 December 1931) is a Taiwanese boxer. He competed in the men's welterweight event at the 1956 Summer Olympics.

References

External links
 

1931 births
Possibly living people
Taiwanese male boxers
Olympic boxers of Taiwan
Boxers at the 1956 Summer Olympics
Place of birth missing (living people)
Welterweight boxers
20th-century Taiwanese people